Isocoma tenuisecta, commonly called burroweed, shrine jimmyweed, or burrow goldenweed is a North American species of small, flowering perennial herbs in the family Asteraceae. It is native to Arizona, New Mexico, and Sonora.

Isocoma tenuisecta grows 1 to 3 feet (30–90 cm) tall. Leaves are narrowly lance-shaped, with numerous large teeth or small lobes along the edges.  The leaves are glandular and lobed.  The plant flowers in September through November, with clusters of heads at the ends of branches and on top of the main stem. Each head contains 8-15 yellow disc flowers but no ray flowers. The old heads turn dry and tan and remain on the plant after the achenes have dispersed.

Burroweed is poisonous to mammals, including cattle, which can transfer the poison to humans through milk.

Gallery

References

External links
photo of herbarium specimen at Missouri Botanical Garden, collected near Tucson in 1884

tenuisecta
Flora of Arizona
Flora of New Mexico
Flora of Sonora
Taxa named by Edward Lee Greene